Ali Alilu (born 1961) is an Iranian politician.

Alilu was born in Tehran from the Azerbaijanis family from Shabestar in East Azerbaijan Province. He is a member of the present Islamic Consultative Assembly from the electorate of Shabestar. Alilu won with 16,214 (27.30%) votes.

References

External links
 Alilu Website

20th-century Iranian politicians
1961 births
Politicians from Tehran
Deputies of Shabestar
Living people
Members of the 9th Islamic Consultative Assembly
Iranian Azerbaijanis